Jambojet Limited is a Kenyan low-cost airline that started operations on 1 April 2014.  It is a subsidiary of Kenya Airways and is headquartered in  Nairobi, Kenya.

History
Willem Alexander Hondius was appointed as CEO in September 2013, reporting to the board of directors, chaired by Ayisi Makatiani. Before his appointment, Hondius was general manager for KLM Royal Dutch Airlines for Eastern Africa based in Nairobi since 2012.  The airline aimed to directly employ 24 employees, hire 20 pilots from Kenya Airways, and source 30 crew members from third parties.

Operations commenced on 1 April 2014. The Kenya Civil Aviation Authority authorised the airline to fly to Burundi, Comoros, the Democratic Republic of the Congo, Ethiopia, Madagascar, Mayotte, Rwanda, Somalia, South Sudan, Tanzania, and Uganda.

Corporate affairs

Ownership
The airline is a wholly owned subsidiary of Kenya Airways. Its equity consists of 5,000 shares each with a nominal value of KSh 20/=.

Business trends
Jambojet's performance and financial figures are fully incorporated within the Kenya Airways Group report and accounts.

Available figures for Jambojet are shown below - until March 2017, accounting dates were for the year ending 31 March; this changed to year ending 31 December from 2017, to align with accounting dates for the parent company.  (Note also: Jambojet commenced operations in April 2014; therefore start-up costs, but no income, arose in the financial year to March 2014.)

Destinations

Jambojet flies to 7 domestic routes within Kenya, as well as 1 international destination as of September 2021. Jambojet suspended operations into Entebbe and Kigali in August 2020 due to the effects of COVID-19.

Fleet

Current fleet
, Jambojet operates the following aircraft:

Historical fleet
The company has previously operated the following aircraft:

 Boeing 737-300

See also
Transport in Kenya

References

External links
 

Low-cost carriers
Airlines of Kenya
Kenya Airways
Kenyan companies established in 2013
Airlines established in 2013